Mamuka Chikovani (born 20 August, 1976) is a Georgian politician who is a United National Movement (UNM) Member of the Parliament of Georgia. He has been a member of parliament since 2016 and is a graduate from the faculty of law at Georgian Technical University. He is a former mayor of the city of Rustavi, the capital of the province of Kvemo Kartli in the south-east of Georgia.

Career

 1998–1999 television "Kldekari" director
 1999–2000 Head of the Rustavi Division of the Department of Youth Affairs 
 2000–2002 Director of the Public Relations Center 
 2002–2004 Secretary, Rustavi City Council
 2004–2008 Chairman, Rustavi City Council 
 2008–2011 Mayor of Rustavi
 2011–2013 First Deputy Governor of Kvemo Kartli
 2016–Present Member of the Parliament of Georgia from the United National Movement

References

1976 births
Living people
Members of the Parliament of Georgia
United National Movement (Georgia) politicians
21st-century politicians from Georgia (country)